Martin Terry is an American former basketball player known for his collegiate career at the University of Arkansas in the early 1970s. Terry currently holds the top two single season scoring averages, overall career scoring average, was a two-time All-Southwest Conference (SWC) First Team honoree, and was named the 1973 SWC Player of the Year.

A native of Emporia, Kansas, Terry attended Emporia High School before enrolling at Hutchinson Community College to play junior college basketball. He played for two seasons for the Blue Dragons before transferring to Arkansas in 1970–71. In Terry's time at Arkansas, he first averaged 24.3 points and 5.4 rebounds per game as a junior, then 28.3 points and 3.7 rebounds per game as a senior. In addition to holding the top two season and overall career scoring averages, Terry scored 30 or more points in 18 of 52 career games, including a then-school single game record of 47 against SMU on February 24, 1973. That season, Terry was named the SWC Player of the Year as well as an honorable mention All-American by the Associated Press. For his career he scored 1,368 points, which as of the end of the 2021–22 season is still the 17th highest mark in program history.

Following college, the Chicago Bulls selected Terry in the 1973 NBA draft in the third round (39th overall), though he never ended up playing in the NBA. He was also drafted by the Utah Stars of the ABA but did not appear in a game for them, either. Both teams already had deep rotations at the guard position, eliminating the gaps for which Terry's skill set would have provided value.

References

External links
 Martin Terry @ TheDraftReview

1950s births
Living people
American men's basketball players
Arkansas Razorbacks men's basketball players
Basketball players from Kansas
Chicago Bulls draft picks
Emporia High School alumni
Hutchinson Blue Dragons men's basketball players
People from Emporia, Kansas
Shooting guards
Utah Stars draft picks